Barbara K. Felber is an American biologist specialized in human retrovirus pathogenesis and gene regulation. She is a senior investigator in the vaccine branch at the National Cancer Institute.

Education 
Felber completed a Ph.D. in molecular biology from the University of Bern. She was a postdoctoral researcher in the laboratory of biochemistry at the National Cancer Institute.

Career and research 
In 1985, Felber joined the Molecular Mechanisms of Carcinogenesis Laboratory of the National Cancer Institute contract Basic Research Program. In 1990, she established the Human Retrovirus Pathogenesis Group. In 1998, Felber received her tenure appointment and, in 1999, she joined the Center for Cancer Research at the National Cancer Institute. Her work focuses on the posttranscriptional mechanisms of gene regulation, use of cytokines in cancer and AIDS, and the development of DNA-based HIV vaccines. Felber is a senior investigator in the National Cancer Institute vaccine branch.

References 

Living people
Year of birth missing (living people)
Place of birth missing (living people)
University of Bern alumni
National Institutes of Health people
20th-century American women scientists
21st-century American women scientists
20th-century American biologists
21st-century American biologists
American women biologists
American medical researchers
Women medical researchers